Stone, Carpenter & Willson was a Providence, Rhode Island based architectural firm in the late 19th and early 20th Centuries.  It was named for the partners Alfred Stone (1834–1908), Charles E. Carpenter (1845–1923). and Edmund R. Willson (1856–1906). The firm was one of the state's most prominent.

It was established about 1885 when Willson became a full partner in the Providence architectural firm of Stone & Carpenter.

Partner biographies

Alfred Stone was born in East Machias, Maine, in 1834.  He attended the Washington Academy in that town.  His family later moved to Salem, Massachusetts.  After graduating high school, he began his architectural training.  He worked for Towle & Foster, Shepard S. Woodcock, Washburn & Brown, and Arthur Gilman.  In 1859 he began working for Providence architect Alpheus C. Morse.  He studied there until the outbreak of the Civil War.  He went to enlist, but a knee injury prevented him from doing so.  He then worked for various business interests, also traveling in the British Isles.  He opened an architural office in Providence in 1864.  From 1866 to 1871 William H. Emmerton, another Salem man, was Stone's partner.  Emmerton was killed in the Great Revere Train Wreck of 1871.  He practiced alone until 1873, when Charles E. Carpenter became partner.  This association remained unchanged for a decade, when Willson was added.  Stone died December 4, 1908 in Peterborough, New Hampshire.

Charles Edmund Carpenter was born in Pawtucket, Rhode Island on May 1, 1845.  He attended the public schools until the age of 17, when he enlisted in the Union Army.  He was discharged three months later, and returned to school.  He began to work under Providence civil engineer William S. Haines, learning the business.  He became interested in architecture, deciding to study it instead.  He entered the office of Alfred Stone in 1867, and was made a partner in 1873.  He retired from the firm's affairs in 1908, after the death of Stone.  He died in 1923.

Carpenter joined the American Institute of Architects in 1875 as a fellow, and was a founding member of the Rhode Island chapter the same year.

In 1894 he married Eudora C. Sheldon, sister of Walter G. Sheldon.

Edmund Russell Willson was born on April 21, 1856, in West Roxbury, Massachusetts, now part of Boston.  He was the son of Edmund B. Willson, a pastor, and Martha Anne (Buttrick) Willson.  In 1859 Willson removed his family to Salem, where he took charge of the North Church, now the First Church in Salem.  Edmund R. Willson attended Salem High School, graduating at the young age of 15 in 1871.  He then entered Harvard University.  He was there four years, graduating in 1875.  After his graduation, he found a position in the office of Peabody & Stearns, Boston's leading architects.  He also took an additional 9-month course in architecture at the Massachusetts Institute of Technology.  After a year he left Peabody & Stearns and moved to Sturgis & Brigham.  After a year and a half there he left Boston and relocated to New York City, where he worked under Charles Follen McKim in McKim, Mead & Bigelow.  McKim, recognizing Willson's talent and potential, convinced him to study abroad.  He departed in May 1879, with a friend, William E. Chamberlin.  Not long after their arrival in Paris, Willson and Chamberlin both gained admission to the École nationale supérieure des Beaux-Arts, and both entered the atelier of Joseph Auguste Émile Vaudremer.  He returned to the United States in December 1881.  In early 1882 he secured a position in the Providence firm of Stone & Carpenter.  He was soon given a position of high responsibility, taking the firm's designs in a new direction.  Recognizing this, in 1883 Alfred Stone and Charles E. Carpenter decided to admit him as a junior partner.  He was given a full partnership in about 1885, and the firm officially became Stone, Carpenter & Willson.  He remained with them until his death.  On December 14 of 1882 Willson married Anne Lemoine (Frost) Willson, whom he had known in Salem.  He died September 9, 1906, in Petersham, Massachusetts. In 1884 Willson joined the American Institute of Architects, and became a Fellow in 1889 when the AIA merged with the Western Association of Architects and all members became Fellows.

In 1901, a fourth partner, Walter G. Sheldon, was added.  Sheldon had worked at the firm for at least a decade.  Despite the new partner, Sheldon's was not added to the firm's name.  After Willson's death, however, the firm was renamed Stone, Carpenter & Sheldon, which it retained until its end in the 1920s.  Other, later, partners included Sheldon's son, Gilbert Sheldon, and William C. Mustard.

Architectural works

In Providence

Elsewhere in Providence County

In Bristol County

In Newport County

In Washington County

In Kent County

In other states

Gallery

Associated architects and draftsmen
 Walter F. Fontaine
 George F. Hall
 Norman M. Isham
 Frank W. Martin

References

External links

  (Includes architectural drawings by Stone, Carpenter & Willson)
 

Architecture firms based in Rhode Island
Companies based in Providence, Rhode Island
Buildings and structures in Providence, Rhode Island
American companies established in 1885